Ian Hughes (29 March 1939 – 30 April 1976) was an  Australian rules footballer who played with North Melbourne in the Victorian Football League (VFL).

Notes

External links 

1939 births
1976 deaths
Australian rules footballers from Victoria (Australia)
North Melbourne Football Club players